Takuya Hirai is a Japanese politician of the Liberal Democratic Party (LDP), a member of the House of Representatives in the Diet (national legislature). A native of Takamatsu, Kagawa and graduate of Sophia University he was elected to the House of Representatives for the first time in 2000 as a member of the New Frontier Party after running unsuccessfully as an independent in 1996. He later joined LDP.

On September 1, 2021, he became the Digital Minister, who has jurisdiction over the Digital Agency.

Prior to entering politics, he was the president of Nishinippon Broadcasting, which is owned by him and his family.

Personal history

References

External links 
  in Japanese.

1958 births
Living people
Japanese racehorse owners and breeders
Liberal Democratic Party (Japan) politicians
Japanese mass media owners
Members of the House of Representatives (Japan)
New Frontier Party (Japan) politicians
20th-century Japanese politicians
Politicians from Kagawa Prefecture
Sophia University alumni
Television executives
21st-century Japanese politicians
People from Takamatsu, Kagawa